Želechovice nad Dřevnicí is a municipality and village in Zlín District in the Zlín Region of the Czech Republic. It has about 1,800 inhabitants.

Geography
It is located on the left bank of the Dřevnice River, which forms the northern border of the municipal territory. The municipality lies in the Vizovice Highlands.

History
The first written mention of Želechovice nad Dřevnicí is from 1261, when it was owned by the newly established Smilheim monastery in Vizovice.

Transport
The state road I/49, which connects Zlín with Vsetín and Slovak border, goes through the municipality. The municipality also lies on the railway track of regional importance Otrokovice – Zlín – Vizovice.

Želechovice nad Dřevnicí is connected to local public transport network of Zlín and Otrokovice towns (provider Public transport company Zlín-Otrokovice) with trolleybus.

Sights
The landmark of the municipality is the Church of Saints Peter and Paul. The late Baroque building from the mid-18th century replaced an old Gothic church from the 13th century.

Gallery

References

External links

Villages in Zlín District